The ceramic molding process is a production method which guarantees the precision required, and also gives a good surface finish, using a high temperature method to better structure and shape parts. This process also gives a low grade of toleration.

The patterns that ceramic mold uses are plaster, plastic, wood, metal, rubber, etc. The pattern is the shape body of the desired part.

History
Ceramic molding has been around for centuries. When man discovered fire, they got curious of what they could do with the fire, so they experimented with the process of clay and fire, and began the technique known as ceramic molding, or pottery. Archeologists all over the world have discovered hundreds of different types of pottery that have been linked to the history of the place the pottery was found. For example, historians have been able to figure out the exact date and time of some wars because of the pottery. They would look at the pottery and examine the clay, and be able to figure out exactly how old that piece of artwork was, and then be able to get an accurate estimate of when something happened. Ceramic Molding Is a long owned technique by Neanderthal man.

The process
The ceramic molding process can be summarized in 7 steps:
 Step 1: The pattern is designed with the materials already mentioned (plastic, wood, metal, etc.). Many materials can be used as a pattern, because most of them support the low temperature which is used in the Ceramic Molding Process.
 Step 2: The mix is injected into a binder.
 Step 3: Part of some refractory ceramic powder is taken out, according to what is needed.
 Step 4: To the binder, a special gelling is added in order to be mixed.
 Step 5: The slurry is put into the pattern.
 Step 6: The slurry is heated to a high temperature, depending on what is required.
 Step 7: The slurry is allowed to cool and the process is done.

The principal characteristic of the molding process is that it produces very accurate castings.

See also
 Ceramic forming techniques
 Ceramic mold casting

`

Sources
 https://web.archive.org/web/20110717162640/http://www.unicastdev.com/process.htm
 http://www.freepatentsonline.com/5266252.html

Ceramic materials
Pottery